Gymnopilus mullaunius is a species of mushroom in the family Hymenogastraceae.

See also

List of Gymnopilus species

External links
Gymnopilus mullaunius at Index Fungorum

mullaunius
Fungi of North America
Taxa named by Cheryl A. Grgurinovic